Dorothy Joan Swinyard married name Dorothy Chipchase (born 1951), is a female former athlete who competed for England.

Athletics career
Swinyard was the 1973 Scottish champion in the discus.

She represented England in the discus and shot put events, at the 1974 British Commonwealth Games in Christchurch, New Zealand.

Personal life
She is married to the hammer thrower Ian Chipchase.

References

1951 births
Living people
Sportspeople from Tynemouth
Sportspeople from Northumberland
English female discus throwers
English female shot putters
British female shot putters
British female discus throwers
Commonwealth Games competitors for England
Athletes (track and field) at the 1974 British Commonwealth Games